Delfi Galbiati (October 21, 1944 – March 12, 2015) was an actor in the Uruguayan National Theater. He began his career in 1964 in independent Theatre and joined the National Theater (Called "Comedia Nacional") in 1973, performing more than 100 titles. He received the "Florencio" Award (Premio Florencio) five times.

He had a long career.

References

1944 births
2015 deaths
Uruguayan male stage actors